Dada Gorgud — Azerbaijani Soviet 2-episode epic film of 1975 with elements of drama and melodrama produced by the film studio Azerbaijanfilm, based on the Oguz epic "Book of Dede Korkut".

Plot 
Dada Gorghud is a wise old man who witnesses countless human disasters, unprecedented wars and calls the people to work on earth. In the film, there are such feelings as love, friendship, brotherhood and loyalty to the motherland, there are also such moments as fighting and war.

Cast 
Hasan Mammadov — Dada Gorgud
Hashim Gadoyev — Qazan khan
Rasim Balayev — Beyrak
Givi Tokhadze — Alp Aruz
Hamlet Gurbanov — Kipchak Malik
Leyla Shikhlinskaya — Banichichek
Shafiga Mammadova — Burla Khatun
Inara Guliyeva — Seljan
Elchin Mammadov - Karaca shepherd
Farhad Yusifov — Tural
Dinara Yusifova — Gunel
Ali Hagverdiyev — Yalincik
Gunduz Abbasov — Baybura
Afrasiyab Mammadov — Bayandir Khan

References

1975 films
Soviet-era Azerbaijanian films